Prostanthera hindii is a species of flowering plant in the family Lamiaceae and is endemic to the Central Tablelands of New South Wales. It is a small, erect shrub with densely hairy branches, egg-shaped leaves, and mauve flowers with deep mauve to dark purple colouration inside the petal tube.

Description
Flowering mainly occurs from Spring to early summer.

Taxonomy and naming
Prostanthera hindii was first formally described in 1997 by Barry Conn in the journal Telopea. The specific epithet (hindii) honours Peter Hind, who, with Barry Conn, collected the type material.

Distribution and habitat
This mint bush grows in Eucalyptus woodland with a shrubby understorey and is confined to the Central Tablelands of New South Wales.

References

hindii
Flora of New South Wales
Lamiales of Australia
Plants described in 1997
Taxa named by Barry John Conn